Pristobrycon calmoni is a South American species of serrasalmid fish.

Habitat 
It is mostly found in black or acidic waters, and in the turbid waters of the tributaries and main channel of the middle and low Orinoco River.

Description 
This is a small fish.  The body is discoid with the anterodorsal profile slightly curved in a "S" shape. The head is robust and wide. The snout is blunt. There is a preanal spine present. The adipose fin is wide. The head is silver with methalic orange to red at mandibular and opercular regions. The iris is yellow. The body with greenish laterally and mixture of orange and red at the abdominal area. The body is not covered with round or oval black spots. There is a single spot behind the opercular area above the pectoral fin. Fins are pale except the anal that have the basal rays and membranes yellow or orange and the distal area black. The acaudal fin with a terminal black band.

Behaviour 
This is a predatory fish which consumes smaller fish and attacks the fins of others. It eats juveniles and aquatic insects and crustaceans (shrimps). Its diet occasionally includes fruits from the surrounding gallery forest.
This is a solitary species and is never seen in schools.

Comments 
Some authors  recognize two subspecies: Pristobrycon calmoni calmoni  for the Amazonas (Brazil) and Pristobrycon calmoni bilineatus which is found in Venezuela and Guianas. The holotype probably is lost.

Bibliography 

Machado-Allison, A. y W. Fink. 1996. Los peces caribes de Venezuela: diagnosis, claves, espectos ecológicos y evolutivos. Universidad Central de Venezuela CDCH, (Colección Monografías) 52. 149p.  Caracas, Venezuela.
Gery, J. 1972. Poissons characoides de Guyanes II. Familie des Serrasalmidae. Zool. Verged Leiden, 122:134-248.

References 

Fish of Venezuela
Serrasalmidae
Taxa named by Franz Steindachner
Fish described in 1908